Tuesday Knight is the eponymous debut album by American recording artist and actress Tuesday Knight. The album was released by Parc/CBS Records in August 1987 on Vinyl and cassette, and was accompanied by the lead single "Out of Control".

Background

After providing background vocals on Quiet Riot's 1983 album, Metal Health, Knight was signed by Vanity Records in 1984. She was later bought out of her contract and signed to CBS Records, after which, she began recording her debut album.

Almost all tracks were written and produced by Frank Wildhorn, who would go on to become known for the Broadway musical Jekyll & Hyde, of which Knight appeared on the original demo for. The album was also produced by Karl Richardson (The Bee Gees, Diana Ross, Barbra Streisand) and JD Nicholas (of the Commodores), who performed alongside Knight on the track "Celebrate Love". Knight also co-wrote two of the tracks, "Temporary Obsession" and "You're Gonna Need Somebody". Also included is a cover of Prince's "Why You Wanna Treat Me So Bad?".

The opening track, "Out of Control", was released as the album's sole single on August 20, 1987, with an accompanying music video filmed. The song received decent exposure in dance clubs, and was remixed several times with different single releases. In order to promote the album, Knight made a series of mall appearances and also performed at such venues as Madame Wong's West and The Palace.

Track listing

Personnel

Chuck Barth: Programming 
Amanda Bearde: Background vocals
Marissa Benedict: Horn
Michael Benedict: Horn
Lynn Davis: Arranger, background vocals 
Michael Egizi: Producer, songwriter
Danny Jacob: Guitar
Holly Knight: Songwriter
Tuesday Knight: Main performer, background vocals, songwriter
Bob Marlette: Songwriter, guitar, drums, keyboards, synthesizer
James Dean "J.D." Nicholas: Vocals, background vocals
Prince: Songwriter
Sue Shifrin: Songwriter
Charles Rice: Producer
Karl Richardson: Producer, engineer
Duane Roland: Guitar
Joe Torano: Background vocals
Frank Wildhorn: Producer, songwriter, piano

References

External links
Tuesday Knight official site
Rapture Blondie Tribute Band

1987 debut albums